

Day 1 (16 January)
In Men's Singles, on the opening day, play began with Local hope Bernard Tomic struggling in the beginning two sets but later working hard in the next three sets, defeating Spaniard Fernando Verdasco. Juan Martín del Potro also had to earn victory by losing the first set but later winning the next three sets defeating Adrian Mannarino. Meanwhile, Rafael Nadal overcomes Alex Kuznetsov. Spaniard Pere Riba had to defeat compatriot Albert Montañés whereas Ukrainian Sergiy Stakhovsky had to defeat his compatriot Illya Marchenko to advance to the second round. Florent Serra advanced to the second round after Steve Darcis was forced to retire in the third set, leading two sets to love, because of leg cramps. Other seeds such as Tomáš Berdych, Mardy Fish, Nicolás Almagro, Alexandr Dolgopolov, John Isner, Stanislas Wawrinka and Kevin Anderson along with Marcos Baghdatis, Olivier Rochus, Tommy Haas, Andreas Beck and Grigor Dimitrov all progressed comfortably into the second round while Juan Mónaco, Ivan Ljubičić and Jürgen Melzer were sent crashing out in the first round. In the evening, Roger beats Alexander Kudryavtsev in three straight tiebreakers and David Nalbandian advanced to the second round after Jarkko Nieminen was forced to retire in the second set because of stomach cramps.

In Women's Singles, on the opening day, play began with Victoria Azarenka taking out Heather Watson in straight sets. Later, the defending champion, Kim Clijsters gets past qualifier Maria João Köhler. Li Na had an easy win over Ksenia Pervak and Francesca Schiavone square off in two straight easy sets defeating Laura Pous Tió. Wild card Casey Dellacqua overcomes Bojana Jovanovski and Jelena Janković cruise into second round defeating qualifier Laura Robson. Mona Barthel advanced to the second round after Anne Keothavong was forced to retire after the first set because of foodborne illness. Other seeds such as Agnieszka Radwańska, Peng Shuai, Daniela Hantuchová, Julia Görges, Monica Niculescu and Petra Cetkovská along with Anna Tatishvili, Romina Oprandi, Pauline Parmentier, wild card Olivia Rogowska, Eleni Daniilidou, Tsvetana Pironkova, Olga Govortsova and Alberta Brianti all progressed comfortably into the second round while Flavia Pennetta, Lucie Šafářová and Yanina Wickmayer were sent crashing out in the first round. In the evening, top seeded Caroline Wozniacki dismantles Anastasia Rodionova in two straight sets advancing to the second round.

 Seeds out
Men's Singles:  Fernando Verdasco [22],  Juan Mónaco [25],  Ivan Ljubičić [28],  Jürgen Melzer [31]
Women's Singles:  Flavia Pennetta [19],  Lucie Šafářová [24],  Yanina Wickmayer [28]
Schedule of Play

Day 2 (17 January)
In Men's Singles, day two play began with Novak Djokovic dismantling Italian Paolo Lorenzi in three straight sets. Andy Murray lost the first set but later won the next three sets defeating Ryan Harrison. Andy Roddick overcomes Robin Haase and David Ferrer had an easy win over Rui Machado. Gaël Monfils defeats local wild card Marinko Matosevic. Frederico Gil advanced to the second round after Ivan Dodig was forced to retire in the fourth set because of shoulder and back injuries. Also, Édouard Roger-Vasselin advanced to the second round after Xavier Malisse was forced to retire after the first set because of an arm injury. Other seeds such as Gilles Simon, Richard Gasquet, Kei Nishikori, Marcel Granollers and Juan Ignacio Chela along with Matthew Ebden, James Duckworth, Santiago Giraldo, Thomaz Bellucci, Tatsuma Ito, Julien Benneteau and Ryan Sweeting all progressed comfortably into the second round while Radek Štěpánek was sent crashing out in the first round. In the evening, Lleyton Hewitt beats Cedrik-Marcel Stebe and Jo-Wilfried Tsonga outlasts Denis Istomin both advancing to the second round.

In Women's Singles, day two play began with Petra Kvitová easing through to the Third round in Rod Laver Arena in straight sets by defeating Vera Dushevina. Maria Sharapova had an easy win advancing to the third round by defeating Gisela Dulko. Fellow compatriot Maria Kirilenko defeats Jarmila Gajdošová. Jelena Dokić overcomes protected ranking Anna Chakvetadze. Svetlana Kuznetsova outlasts Chanelle Scheepers. Other seeds such as Vera Zvonareva, Marion Bartoli, Sabine Lisicki, Dominika Cibulková, Ana Ivanovic and Angelique Kerber along with Jamie Hampton, Sloane Stephens, Ekaterina Makarova, Shahar Pe'er, Aleksandra Wozniak, Zheng Jie, Lucie Hradecká, Gréta Arn, Stéphanie Dubois and Barbora Záhlavová-Strýcová all progressed comfortably into the second round while Sorana Cîrstea impresses in the fourth round by defeating sixth seeded and US Open defending champion Samantha Stosur. In the evening, five-time champion Serena Williams advances to the second round by defeating Tamira Paszek.

 Seeds out:
Men's Singles:  Radek Štěpánek [29]
Women's Singles:  Samantha Stosur[6]
Schedule of Play

Day 3 (18 January)
Men's Singles on day 3 began with Nadal having straight sets easy win on protected ranking Haas. Berdych wins over Rochus while Dolgopolov knocked out Tobias Kamke. Roger received a walkover into the third round after Andreas Beck withdrew from the tournament because of a lower back injury. Nalbandian puts up a fight but Isner advances to the third round. Philipp Kohlschreiber advanced to the third round after Pere Riba was forced to retire in the second set because of a left foot injury. Other seeds such as Nicolás Almagro, Juan Martín del Potro, Feliciano López and Kevin Anderson along with qualifier Lukáš Lacko, Lu Yen-hsun and Ivo Karlović advance to the third round except Mardy Fish who lost to Colombian Alejandro Falla. Later in the evening, Tomic outlasts Querrey while Stanislas Wawrinka beats Marcos Baghdatis moving into the third round.

Women's Singles on day 3 began with Li Na taking out local home wild card Rogowska in straight sets. Clijsters also progressed overcoming Stéphanie Foretz Gacon. Azarenka too had an easy win in straight sets over local wild card Casey Dellacqua. Janković outlasts qualifier Chang Kai-chen while top seeded dane Wozniacki beat Tatishvili cruising into third round. Hantuchová defeated Lesia Tsurenko after losing the first set. Julia Görges advanced to the third round after Eleni Daniilidou was forced to retire during the second set because of a neck injury. Other seeds such as Agnieszka Radwańska, Anabel Medina Garrigues and Monica Niculescu along with Christina McHale, Nina Bratchikova and Galina Voskoboeva advanced to the third round. The second round witnessed all the seeds go through except Schiavone went out to compatriot Oprandi, Peng to Benešová and Cetkovská to Barthel.

 Seeds out:
Men's Singles:  Mardy Fish [8]
Women's Singles:  Francesca Schiavone [10],  Peng Shuai [16],  Petra Cetkovská [32]
Schedule of Play

Day 4 (19 January)
The fourth day in Men's Singles, began with seeded number one, Djokovic easing through to the third round in Rod Laver Arena in straight sets defeating Santiago Giraldo. Tsonga takes out Ricardo Mello progressing in straight sets while Murray also had an easy win over Édouard Roger-Vasselin. Janko Tipsarević after losing the first set beat local wild card James Duckworth while another local Matthew Ebden puts up a fight winning first two sets but Kei Nishikori advances defeating him in later three sets. Gaël Monfils knocks out Thomaz Bellucci. Richard Gasquet advanced to the third round after Andrey Golubev was forced to retire in the third set because of injury. Gilles Simon went out to compatriot Julien Benneteau. Other seeds such as David Ferrer, Milos Raonic and Juan Ignacio Chela along with Nicolas Mahut advance to the third round while Viktor Troicki, Marcel Granollers and Alex Bogomolov Jr. were sent crashing out in the second round. In the evening, local hope Lleyton Hewitt advanced to the third round after Andy Roddick was forced to retire in the third set because of a hamstring injury.

The fourth day in Women's Singles, began with Sharapova having an easy win over qualifier Jamie Hampton and Serena easing through to the third round in Rod Laver Arena in straight sets defeating Barbora Záhlavová-Strýcová. Ana Ivanovic outlasts Michaëlla Krajicek while Petra Kvitová overcomes Carla Suárez Navarro to reach the second round. Vera Zvonareva defeated Lucie Hradecká. Other seeds such as Sabine Lisicki, Maria Kirilenko and Angelique Kerber along with Sorana Cîrstea advance to the third round. The second round witnessed all the seeds go through except Anastasia Pavlyuchenkova, Dominika Cibulková, Roberta Vinci, Kaia Kanepi and Nadia Petrova were sent crashing out in the second round. In the evening, the last home contingent, Jelena Dokić lost in the second round to Marion Bartoli while Sloane Stephens lost to Svetlana Kuznetsova.

 Seeds out:
Men's Singles:  Gilles Simon [12],  Andy Roddick [15],  Viktor Troicki [19],  Marcel Granollers [26],  Alex Bogomolov Jr. [32]
Women's Singles:  Anastasia Pavlyuchenkova [15],  Dominika Cibulková [17],  Roberta Vinci [23],  Kaia Kanepi [25],  Nadia Petrova [29]
Men's Doubles:  Oliver Marach /  Alexander Peya [9],  Paul Hanley /  Jamie Murray [16]
Women's Doubles:  Raquel Kops-Jones /  Abigail Spears [15]
Schedule of Play

Day 5 (20 January)
On the fifth day, in Men's Singles, Nadal beats qualifier Lukáš Lacko in three straight sets while Federer defeats Ivo Karlović. Feliciano López wins five-set thriller over John Isner. Tomáš Berdych outlasts Kevin Anderson while Nicolás Almagro overcomes Stanislas Wawrinka. Alejandro Falla losses to Philipp Kohlschreiber. In the evening, thirteenth seed Alexandr Dolgopolov went out to Bernard Tomic and Juan Martín del Potro overwhelms Lu Yen-hsun, both advancing to the fourth round.

In Women's Singles, Jelena Janković rolls by Christina McHale while Azarenka gets past Mona Barthel advancing to the fourth round. Seeded number one dane, Wozniacki outlasts Monica Niculescu while Galina Voskoboeva losses to Agnieszka Radwańska and Romina Oprandi went to Julia Görges. Iveta Benešová takes out qualifier Nina Bratchikova in straight sets. In the evening, Li Na advanced to the fourth round after Anabel Medina Garrigues was forced to retire during the first set because of a right ankle injury while Kim Clijsters defeats Daniela Hantuchová advancing to the fourth round.

 Seeds out:
Men's Singles:  Alexandr Dolgopolov [13],  John Isner [16],  Stanislas Wawrinka [21],  Kevin Anderson [30]
Women's Singles:  Daniela Hantuchová [20],  Anabel Medina Garrigues [26],  Monica Niculescu [31]
Men's Doubles:  Simone Bolelli /  Fabio Fognini [14]
Women's Doubles:  Nuria Llagostera Vives /  Arantxa Parra Santonja [13],  Vera Dushevina /  Shahar Pe'er [16]
Schedule of Play

Day 6 (21 January)

 Seeds out:
Men's Singles:  Janko Tipsarević [9],  Gaël Monfils [14],  Milos Raonic [23],  Juan Ignacio Chela [27]
Women's Singles:  Vera Zvonareva [7],  Marion Bartoli [9],  Svetlana Kuznetsova [18],  Maria Kirilenko [27],  Angelique Kerber [30]
Women's Doubles:  Květa Peschke /  Katarina Srebotnik [1],  Natalie Grandin /  Vladimíra Uhlířová [9],  Iveta Benešová /  Barbora Záhlavová-Strýcová [10],  Hsieh Su-wei /  Galina Voskoboeva [14]
Mixed Doubles:  Maria Kirilenko /  Daniel Nestor [3]
Schedule of Play

Day 7 (22 January)

 Seeds out:
Men's Singles:  Nicolás Almagro [10],   Feliciano López [18]
Women's Singles:  Li Na [5],  Jelena Janković [13],  Julia Görges [22]
Men's Doubles:  Michaël Llodra /  Nenad Zimonjić [3], Mahesh Bhupathi /  Rohan Bopanna [4],  Colin Fleming /  Ross Hutchins [15]
Women's Doubles:  Gisela Dulko /  Flavia Pennetta [4]
Mixed Doubles:  Květa Peschke /  Mike Bryan [1]
Schedule of Play

Day 8 (23 January)

 Seeds out:
Men's Singles:  Jo-Wilfried Tsonga [6],  Richard Gasquet [17]
Women's Singles:  Serena Williams [12],  Sabine Lisicki [14],  Ana Ivanovic [21]
Men's Doubles:  Jürgen Melzer /  Philipp Petzschner [5],  Aisam-ul-Haq Qureshi /  Jean-Julien Rojer [8],  František Čermák /  Filip Polášek [11]
Women's Doubles:  Maria Kirilenko /  Nadia Petrova [5],  Daniela Hantuchová /  Agnieszka Radwańska [8],  Jarmila Gajdošová /  Bethanie Mattek-Sands [12]
Schedule of Play

Day 9 (24 January)

Seeds out:
Men's Singles:  Tomáš Berdych [7],  Juan Martín del Potro [11]
Women's Singles:  Caroline Wozniacki [1],  Agnieszka Radwańska [8]
Men's Doubles:  Mariusz Fyrstenberg /  Marcin Matkowski [6],  Scott Lipsky /  Rajeev Ram [13]
Women's Doubles:  Liezel Huber /  Lisa Raymond [2],  Vania King /  Yaroslava Shvedova [3]
Schedule of Play

Day 10 (25 January)

 Seeds out:
Men's Singles:  David Ferrer [5],  Kei Nishikori [24]
Men's Doubles:  Eric Butorac /  Bruno Soares [10],  Santiago González /  Christopher Kas [12]
Women's Doubles:  Sania Mirza /  Elena Vesnina [6],  Andrea Hlaváčková /  Lucie Hradecká [7]
Mixed Doubles:  Andrea Hlaváčková /  Aisam-ul-Haq Qureshi [7]
Schedule of Play

Day 11 (26 January)

 Seeds out:
Men's Singles:  Roger Federer [3]
Women's Singles:  Petra Kvitová [2],  Kim Clijsters [11]
Men's Doubles:  Max Mirnyi /  Daniel Nestor [2],  Robert Lindstedt /  Horia Tecău [7]
Mixed Doubles:  Lisa Raymond /  Rohan Bopanna [4]
Schedule of Play

Day 12 (27 January)

 Seeds out:
Men's Singles:  Andy Murray [4]
Women's Doubles:  Sara Errani /  Roberta Vinci [11]
Mixed Doubles:  Sania Mirza /  Mahesh Bhupathi [6]
Schedule of Play

Day 13 (28 January)

 Seeds out:
Women's Singles:  Maria Sharapova [4]
Men's Doubles:  Bob Bryan /  Mike Bryan [1]
Schedule of Play

Day 14 (29 January)

 Seeds out:
Men's Singles:  Rafael Nadal [2]
Mixed Doubles:  Elena Vesnina /  Leander Paes [5]
Schedule of Play

References

Day-by-day summaries
Australian Open (tennis) by year – Day-by-day summaries